Om Prasad Pun (born 1942) is a Nepalese boxer. He competed in the men's light welterweight event at the 1964 Summer Olympics.

References

External links
 

1942 births
Living people
Nepalese male boxers
Olympic boxers of Nepal
Boxers at the 1964 Summer Olympics
Place of birth missing (living people)
Light-welterweight boxers